The Buruna, also known as the Punduna, are an Aboriginal Australian people of the Mid West region of Western Australia.

Language
The Buruna spoke Buruna, which belongs to the Kanyara branch of the Pama-Nyungan language family

Country
He places them at Yannarie River (Pindar Creek) and southwest as far as Winning Pool and the northern side of the Lyndon River. Their eastern confines lay around Mount Hamlet and Maroonah. They occasionally ventured into Tenma territory at the Henry River.

History of contact
The remnants of the Buruna moved to and settled around Towera Station.

Alternative names
 Budoona
 Peedona
 Poordoona
 Puduna
 Wati Puruna

Source:

Notes

Citations

Sources

Aboriginal peoples of Western Australia